Turkey Mountain is a hill (despite its name) located in Yorktown Heights, New York. The hill is located on a land reserve and is currently maintained by the Yorktown Land Trust.

References 

Landforms of Westchester County, New York
Protected areas of Westchester County, New York
Hills of New York (state)